Trichostylum is a genus of flies in the family Tachinidae.

Species
Trichostylum curryi Barraclough, 1992
Trichostylum flavicorne (Malloch, 1930)
Trichostylum flavum Barraclough, 1992
Trichostylum fuscolaterale Barraclough, 1992
Trichostylum grandipalpe Barraclough, 1992
Trichostylum longivittatum Barraclough, 1992
Trichostylum parafaciale Barraclough, 1992
Trichostylum parvungulatum Barraclough, 1992
Trichostylum peculiare (Malloch, 1930)
Trichostylum pilosoculatum Barraclough, 1992
Trichostylum racematum Barraclough, 1992
Trichostylum rufipalpe Macquart, 1851
Trichostylum vittatum Barraclough, 1992

References

Dexiinae
Diptera of Australasia
Taxa named by Pierre-Justin-Marie Macquart
Tachinidae genera